This is a list of known Japanese operations planned, executed or aborted during the Second World War.

See also
Japanese expansion (1941–1942)

Pacific theatre of World War II
 
 
Naval aviation operations and battles
South-East Asian theatre of World War II
World War II operations and battles of the Pacific theatre
Military operations of World War II